Maria Konopnicka Special Education School Complex in Pabianice, Poland is one of the oldest special education schools in Poland. Named after Maria Konopnicka, the school was established around 1922 by teachers who were at once at the forefront of special education teaching in Poland. Many held degree from the National Special Education Institute (Państwowy Instytut Pedagogiki Specjalnej established in 1922 by Maria Grzegorzewska). In 1972, the school was awarded the Polish National Education (Komisja Edukacji Narodowej) award for excellence in teaching and education. The school organizes a special olympics and participates in competitions and other extramural programs and integration programs. Currently there are vocational classes beyond the primary school.

History
 September 1, 1922 – Children with disabilities were admitted to the primary school on St. Rocha 17 street in Pabianice.
 February 13, 1927 – The initial class is converted to special education primary school.
 1939–1945 – During the Nazi occupation, the school is occupied by Nazi military and is used as school for German children.
 April 1945 – The school is re-established in a still ruined building.
 1971–1972 – 50-year anniversary.
 1972 – The school is awarded the National Education Award (medal Komisji Edukacji Narodowej) for excellence in teaching and special education.
 1998–1999 – The school organized the VIth County Sport Olympics (VI Dziecięca Wojewódzka Olimpiada Sportowa), which includes integration program.

Scouting
Beginning in 1951, Scouting was established. In 1955 Scouts publish in leading youth magazine of that period in Poland, Świat Młodych.

Outstanding teachers
First school principal was Feliks Papieski. He was one of the early pioneers of special education in Poland.

External links
 Maria Konopnicka Special School Complex in Pabianice, Poland

Special education schools in Poland
Educational institutions established in 1922
1922 establishments in Poland
Buildings and structures in Łódź Voivodeship